James Henry Callander (18 August 1803 – 31 January 1851), of Craigforth, Stirlingshire, was a Scottish politician.

Background
Callander was the eldest son of Colonel George Callander of Craigforth, son of Sir James Campbell Callander and Elizabeth MacDonnell, daughter of the 5th Earl of Antrim. His mother was Elizabeth Erskine.

Career
Callander was the 5th Callander Laird of Craigforth, Stirlingshire, and 16th Laird of Ardkinglas, Argyllshire. He sat as Member of Parliament for Argyllshire from 1832 to 1835.

Family

Callander married firstly his cousin Jane Plumer Erskine (1818–1846), daughter of David Erskine, 2nd Baron Erskine and Frances Cadwallader, on 29 August 1837. They had three daughters:

 Fanny Jane Callander.
 Mary Hermione, who married 1stly Charles Sartoris; and secondly George Henry Dawkins, of Over Norton Park.
 Janey Sevilla Callander, theatre producer. She married Lord Archibald Campbell, brother of John Campbell, 9th Duke of Argyll, on 12 January 1869. Their son Niall became the 10th Duke.

After his first wife's death in 1846 Callander married as his second wife Charlotte Edith Eleanora Campbell (1827-1849), daughter of John George Campbell of Ardpatrick, Argyll, on 1 July 1847. They had two sons

 George Frederick William Livingston-Campbell-Callander, who succeeded to Craigforth and Ardkinglas.
 Henry Barrington Callander of Ardchyline.

Callander died in January 1851.

References

External links 
 

1803 births
1851 deaths
Members of the Parliament of the United Kingdom for Scottish constituencies
UK MPs 1832–1835
People educated at Eton College